The 1930 Temporary Anglo-Soviet Commercial Agreement was an agreement signed in London on April 16, 1930, to promote trade between the United Kingdom and the Russian Socialist Federal Soviet Republic. It was signed by Foreign Secretary Arthur Henderson and Soviet Plenipotentiary in London Grigory Sokolnikov.

Content
Temporary Commercial Agreement between His Majesty's Government in the United Kingdom and the Government of the Union of Soviet Socialist Republics — London, April 16, 1930

His Majesty's Government in the United Kingdom of Great Britain and Northern Ireland and the Government of the Union of Soviet Socialist Republics, being mutually desirous to conclude as soon as possible a formal treaty of Commerce and Navigation between the United Kingdom of Great Britain and Northern Ireland and the Union of Soviet Socialist Republics, have meanwhile agreed upon the following temporary Agreement to serve as a modus vivendi pending the conclusions of such a Treaty.

Article 1
For the purpose of developing and strengthening the trade relations between the United Kingdom of Great Britain and Northern Ireland and the Union of Soviet Socialist Republics, the Contracting Parties agree that without prejudice to any more favourable provisions contained below, all facilities, rights and privileges which in the United Kingdom and the Union of Socialist Republics respectively are or may be accorded with respect to trade to the subjects or citizens of juridical persons including companies constituted under the laws of such State or to the property of such subjects, citizens or juridical persons including companies of the Union of Soviet Socialist Republics and to eht British subjects, British protected persons or juridical persons including companies of the United Kingdom respectively and to their property. The natural produce and manufactures of the United Kingdom shall enjoy in the United Soviet Socialist Republics and the natural produce and manufactures of the Union Socilist Republics shall enjoy in the United Kingdom, all the facilities, rights and privileges which are at present or may be hereafter accorded to  the natural produce and manufactures of any other foreign country, in all that relates to the prohibition and the restriction of imports and exports, customs duties and charges, transport, warehousing, drawbacks and excise.

Nothing in the present Agreement shall apply to-

(a) the special provisions relating to trade contained in treaties which the Union of Soviet Socialist Republics has concluded, or may concluded, hereafter with those States, the entire territory of which on the 1. August, 1914, formed in all respects an integral part of the former Russian Empire or with the continental border States in Asia;

(b) the rights which have been accorded or may be accorded to any third country forming part of a customs union with the Union of Soviet Socialist Republics;

(c) the privileges which the Union of Soviet Socialist Republics has accorded, or may accord, to border States with respect to local trade between the inhabitants of the frontier zones.

NOTE.- The expression “British protected persons” in this Agreement is understood to mean persons belonging to any territory under His Majesty’s protection or suzerainty or in respect of which a Mandate has been accepted by His Majesty. It is understood, however, that the stipulations of Article 1 do not apply to persons belonging to any such territory to which the present Agreement is not extended in accordance with the provisions of Article 5.

Article 2
1.In view of the fact that , by virtue of the laws of the Union of Soviet Socialist Republics, the foreign trade of the Union is a State monopoly, His Majesty's Government in the United Kingdom agree to accord to the Government of the Union of Soviet Socialist Republics the right to establish in London a Trade Delegation, consisting of the Trade Representative of the Union of Soviet Socialist Republics and his two deputies, forming part of the Embassy of the

2. The   head of the  Trade Delegation shall be  the  Trade Representative of the  Union of  Soviet Socialist Republics in the  United Kingdom. He and   his   two   deputies shall   , by  virtue of paragraph 1 of  the   present Article, be  accorded all   diplomatic privileges and immunities, and immunity shall attach to  the   offices occupied by  the   Trade Delegation ( Fifth Floor, East Wing, Bush House, Aldwych, London) and   used   exclusively for  the  purpose de fined in  paragraph 3 of the  present Article.

3. The functions of  the   Trade Delegation shall be:

(a) To  facilitate and   encourage the   development of  trade and commerce between the   United Kingdom and   the   Union of  Soviet Socialist Republics.

(b)To represent the interests of the Union of Soviet Socialist Republics in all that pertains to the foreign trade of the Union, and to control, regulate, and carry on such trade with the United Kingdom for and on behalf of the Union of Soviet Socialist Republics.

4.

5.  The names of the Trade Representative and of the persons empowered to represent him shall be periodically published in the Board of Trade Journal and in addition shall in otherways be clearly made known to the public. The authority of these persons to represent the Trade Delegation shall continue until such time as  notice to  the contrary has been similarly published.
6.  Any questions which may arise in respect of commercial transactions entered into in the United Kingdom by the Trade Delegation shall be determined by the Courts of the United Kingdom in accordance with the laws thereof.
7.  The property of the Union of Soviet Socialist Republics in the United Kingdom shall be subject to such measures as  may lawfully be taken to  give effect to  the  Orders of the Courts of the United Kingdom, in so far as these Orders have been issued in connexion with transactions referred to in Paragraph 6, unless it is property which, according to international law, is immune from such measures as being necessary for the exercise of the rights of State sovereignty or for the official functions of the diplomatic or consular representatives of the Union of Soviet Socialist Republics.

Article 3
The vessels of the Union of Soviet Socialist Republics and their cargoes and passengers and British vessels and their cargoes and passengers shall enjoy in the ports and territorial waters of the United Kingdom and of the Union of Soviet Socialist Republics respectively, the same rights, privileges and facilities as are enjoyed, or may been joyed hereafter by national vessels, their cargoes and passengers, or the vessels of the most favoured foreign country and their cargoes and passengers. The   provisions of this   Article does  not  extend to  the  coasting trade. The Contracting Parties reserve the  right to  limit to  national ships the coasting trade between ports on  the same coast.  In  regard to  trade between ports not   on  the   same coast they undertake to  accord of  the ships of  each other treatment not   less   favourable than that accorded to the   ships of  any   other foreign country. The   provisions of  the   present Article shall not   extend to:

(a )  The application of  special laws for   the   safeguarding, renewal and development of  the   national merchant fleet.

(b) Privileges granted to  marines ports societies.

(c ) Port services, including pilotage, towage and   lifesaving and maritime assistance.

Note 1.

Note 2.  Nothing in  this   Article shall affect the   right of  either Party to  apply regulations in  accordance with its  national legislation for  the  transportation of  immigrants, emigrants and   pilgrims.
Note3.

Article 4

Article 5
The provisions of the present Agreement may also be extended on condition of reciprocity to any of His Majesty's colonies, possessions or protectorates or to any mandated territory administered by His Majesty's Government in the United Kingdom if a notification to that effect is given to the Government of the Union of Soviet Socialist Republics by His Majesty's Ambassador at Moscow or, in his absence, by His Majesty's Chargé d'Affaires.

Article 6
So long as in any territory referred to in Articles 4 or 5 which is not bound by the present Agreement the natural produce and manufactures of the Union of Soviet Socialist Republics are accorded treatment as favourable as that accorded to the natural produce and manufactures of any other foreign country, the natural produce and manufactures of such territory shall enjoy in the Union of Soviet Socialist Republics complete and unconditional most favoured nation treatment. At the same time, however, the Government of the Union of Soviet Socialist Republics reserves to itself the right to denounce this Article at any time in respect of any particular Dominion or of India.

Article 7
In witness where of the undersigned, duly authorised for that purpose,  have signed the present Agreement,  and have affixed there to their seals. Done in  duplicateat  London in  the   English language the   Sixteenth day   of  April,  One Thous and Nine Hundred and Thirty.

A translation shall be made into the Russian language as soon as possible and agreed upon between the Contracting Parties. Both texts shall then be considered authentic for all purposes.

(L. S. ) (signed) G.  Sokolnikoff. (L.  S. ) (signed) Arthur Henderson.

Protocol

In  concluding the  present Agreement the  Contracting Parties are animated by  the   intention to  eliminate from their economic relations all  forms of  discrimination.

Done at  London the   16th April 1930   .(signed) G.  Sokolnikoff.(signed) Arthur Henderson.

Additional Protocol
With reference to paragraph 6 of Article 2 it is understood that   the privileges and   immunities conferred on  the  head of the  Trade Delegation and   his  two   deputies by  paragraph 2 of  Article 2 of  the   present Agreement shall not   be  claimed in  connexion with any proceedings before the   Courts of  the   United Kingdom a rising out   of  commercial transactions entered in to in  the   United Kingdom by  the   Trade Delegation of  the   Union of  Soviet Socialist Republics. Do neat  London the   16th April 1930   .(signed) G. Sokolnikoff. (signed) Arthur Henderson.

Soviet wheat exports and Holodomor 
In 1928, with 190 million Bushels, United Kingdom of Great Britain and Ireland were the world’s voracious  importer of wheat, of which 50 percent came from Canada and Australia.
In 1931, on the eve of the Holodomor, the United Kingdom become the principal buyer of Russian-Ukrainian wheat. 
1931 the Soviet Union had become Britain’s chief supplier of wheat. Imports rose from zero in 1929 to over 5 million bushels in the first three months of 1931 

After the signing of the Ottawa Agreements with the Dominions of the Commonwealth in the summer of 1932, Britain was obliged to abandon the Anglo-Soviet trade agreement of 1930. This decision, prompted primarily by pressure from the Canadian wheat and timber lobby, was announced on 17 October 1932.

References

See also
Metro-Vickers Affair
Anglo-Soviet Trade Agreement
Anglo-Soviet Agreement of 1941
Anglo-Soviet relations
Anglo-Soviet Treaty of 1942

Russian Soviet Federative Socialist Republic
Holodomor
Russia–United Kingdom relations
Treaties of the Soviet Union
Soviet Union–United Kingdom relations
Foreign trade of the Soviet Union
1930 in the United Kingdom
Treaties concluded in 1930
1930 in the Soviet Union
Trade in the United Kingdom